Dmytro "Metro" Prystai (November 7, 1927 – October 8, 2013) was a Canadian ice hockey forward.

Prystai began his National Hockey League career with the Chicago Black Hawks in 1947. He also played for the Detroit Red Wings. He left the NHL following the 1958 season, playing part of one season in the minors before retiring. He won two Stanley Cups with Detroit in 1952, 1954, and made three All-Star Game appearances in his 12-year NHL career.

After his hockey career Prystai operated an insurance company in Wynyard, Sask. Prystai was a widower with both spouses Evelyne and Mavis predeceasing him.

He died on October 8, 2013 in a nursing home in Wynyard, Saskatchewan. He was 85.

Early life
Prystai's parents Harold and Annie Prystai were from Ternopil, Ukraine.

References

External links

1927 births
2013 deaths
Canadian ice hockey centres
Canadian people of Ukrainian descent
Chicago Blackhawks players
Detroit Red Wings players
Edmonton Flyers (WHL) players
Ice hockey people from Saskatchewan
Sportspeople from Yorkton
Stanley Cup champions